is one of five major Japanese construction companies along with Shimizu Corporation, Takenaka Corporation, Kajima Corporation, and Taisei Corporation. It is listed on the Tokyo Stock Exchange and is one of the Nikkei 225 corporations. Its headquarters are in Minato, Tokyo. In 2018, Obayashi was ranked 15th place on ENR's list of Top 250 Global Contractors, the highest rank among Japanese Contractors.

Established in 1892 in Osaka, the company operates in Japan and other countries, especially Southeast Asia and Australia, as well as the United States and Europe. Major landmarks it has constructed in Japan include the Kyoto Station Building, the Tokyo Broadcasting System (TBS) Center in Tokyo, as well as the Tokyo Skytree.

Obayashi has 86 subsidiaries and 26 affiliated companies in Japan, Europe, the Middle East, Asia, Australia and North America.

In February 2012, the company announced plans to build a space elevator by 2050.

Corporate timeline
 1892: Obayashi, a Building Construction and Civil Engineering Construction Contractor founded by Yoshigoro Obayashi in Osaka
 1936: Obayashi Corporation (OC) established
 1965: Obayashi Corporation (Singapore) established
 1969: Surfrider Hotel, HI completed
 1970: Princess Kaiulani Hotel, HI completed
 1972: Obayashi America Corporation (OAC) established in Los Angeles
PT. Jaya Obayashi established in Indonesia as a joint venture with PT. Pembangunan Jaya.
 1975: Hotel Kyoto Inn San Francisco, CA completed
 1978: James E. Roberts - Obayashi Corporation (RO) joins the Obayashi Group
 1981: Obayashi Corporation San Francisco Office established (Civil Engineering Construction)
 1982: Obayashi Corporation opens office in New York
 1988: Toyota Manufacturing Facility, KY completed
 1989: E.W. Howell Co., Inc. (EWH) joins the Obayashi Group
 1991: NEC Roseville Semiconductor Plant Mega-Line, CA completed
 1991: Delta Center/Utah Jazz Arena, UT completed
 1993: OC America Construction Inc. (OCAC) established in Los Angeles
 1994: OC Real Estate Management, LLC (OCREM) organized in Los Angeles
 1997: Sumitomo Sitix of Phoenix, AZ completed
 1997: Matsushita Semiconductor (MASCA), WA completed
 1998: Komatsu Silicon America, OR completed
 1998: San Bernardino (Arrowhead) Medical Center, CA completed
 2001: Applied Materials (AMAT), CA completed
 2002: Obayashi USA, LLC (OUSA) established in Los Angeles
 2002: Obayashi Construction, Inc. (OCI) established in Los Angeles
 2003: Cedars-Sinai Medical Center Central Plant, CA completed
 2003: Interstate Distributors, CA completed
 2005: John S. Clark Company, LLC (JSC) joins the Obayashi Group
 2007: Webcor, LP joins the Obayashi Group
 2011: Kenaidan Contracting, Ltd joins the Obayashi Group

Notable Constructions

Asia

Japan
Kansai International Airport
Koshien Stadium
Tokyo Bay Aqua-Line
Oasis 21
Kyoto Station
TBS
Osaka Dome
Namba Parks
Osaka WTC Building
Shinjuku Takashimaya Times Square
Marunouchi Building
Roppongi Hills Mori Tower
Tokyo Skytree
Toranomon Hills

Singapore
Jewel Changi Airport
DUO
One Raffles Quay
Ocean Financial Centre
Singapore MRT (North South Line, East West Line and North East Line)
Singapore Management University
Esplanade Bridge
Plaza Singapura

Taiwan

Taiwan HSR
Taipei Metro (Tamsui Line)
Taipei Dome

Vietnam

Thủ Thiêm Tunnel

Thailand

Bangkok MRT

United Arab Emirates

Dubai Metro

Oceania

Australia

Stadium Australia

North America

United States

Mike O'Callaghan – Pat Tillman Memorial Bridge, also known as the Hoover Dam Bypass

See also
Aeropolis 2001

References

External links

Official Website 
Obayashi United States Operations

Engineering companies of Japan
Construction and civil engineering companies based in Tokyo
Real estate companies based in Tokyo
Companies listed on the Tokyo Stock Exchange
Companies listed on the Fukuoka Stock Exchange
Construction and civil engineering companies established in 1892
Japanese brands
Midori-kai
Japanese  companies established in 1892